According to the Book of Mormon, the people commonly referred to as the Amulonites were composed of the priests of king Noah and the daughters of the Lamanites, whom the Amulonites took to wife by force. They are named after Amulon, their leader.

Book of Mormon history
The Amulonites (existing from about 147 BC to about 87 BC) were relatively few but nevertheless acted as a catalyst for war between the Lamanites and Nephites. They worked tirelessly to "stir up the unconverted Lamanites to war against their converted brethren, and then against the Nephites. (Alma 25:2)   The Amulonites seem to only be included in the record as an example of what not to do.  Without the Amulonites, the Lamanites would not have attacked the Nephites as many times as they did, nor would the people of Ammon or Anti-Nephi-Lehies have left their lands to find a better life.

Time line

Origins 

During the invasion of the Lamanites at the end of the reign of Nephite king Noah, Amulon and the other priests of Noah fled to escape being executed by the people. Being too ashamed to return to the city and "Fearing that the people would slay them", Amulon and his fellow priests did not return to the city of Nephi and left their wives and children in the city.

In the wilderness it appears that the priests had wandered into the Land of Shemlon, where the daughters of Lamanites gathered together to make themselves merry.  From a hidden location, the priests "laid and watched them". They waited until there were only a few that gathered to dance, then the priests burst out from where they were hiding and carried off the daughters, which numbered twenty-four.

The Lamanites became convinced that the people of Limhi had stolen their daughters and so went to war against the people of Limhi.  But after being driven back the Lamanites, Limhi and Gideon inform the king of the Lamanites that the priests of Noah had fled and that they may be responsible disappearance of their daughters.

Later the Lamanites found the Amulonites in the land of Amulon.  Amulon, who is mentioned as the Amulonites' leader, gained compassion from the Lamanites by pleading for the lives of his people using their wives, who were in reality those daughters of the Lamanites who were abducted.  The people commonly referred to as the Amulonites  are composed of the priests of King Noah and the daughters of the Lamanites. (Mosiah 23:31-34)  From that period the Amulonites were joined in purpose with the Lamanites and were referred to using the Lamanite title from then on.

Other appearances 

In the time that the sons of Mosiah were preaching to the Lamanites, the Nephites were considered more wicked than the Lamanites, and their religious manner was patterned after the order of Nehor, or using priestcraft that was not taught in the Mosaic code. They aided the Lamanites in building the city of Jerusalem. None were converted by Aaron. (Alma 23:14)

After the conversion of the anti-nephi-lehies (See Anti-nephi-lehies in the Book of Mormon), the Lamanites rebelled against the king of all the Lamanites.  This was done to take arms against the Ammonites, and slay many believers among them.

After the Ammonites fled into Nephite lands, the Amulonites, along with the Amalekites, went to war against the Nephites, resulting in the destruction of the city of Ammonihah.
But being driven back with a great slaughter, the armies of the Lamanites fled the field of battle but had suffered greatly in the battle.  In fact, of the Amulonites it is said of the battle  "slain almost all the seed of Amulon and his brethren".

In the retreat of the Lamanites the Amulonites had usurped "power and authority" over the Lamanites due to the increased amount of Lamanites converting to the gospel.  Many Lamanites were caused to be put to death by fire. (Alma 25:5-7) This act apparently turned the Lamanites against the Amulonites.(Alma 25:8) Thus the Amulonites became a hunted people and this fulfilled a prophecy uttered by Abinadi, see Alma 25:9-12.

After these events, the Amulonites cease to be mentioned in the Book of Mormon.

The children of Amulon vs. the children of the Amulonites 

There are two groups considered to be the children of the Amulonites and Amulon (their leader).
 Children of Amulon and his brethren were the children through their Nephite wives before the priests of Noah were separated from the Nephites.
 The children of the Amulonites spoken of after the priests of Noah were separated from the Nephites, were children through their wives who were Lamanite Daughters.

See Mosiah 25:12.

References

External links
 History recap of the Amulonites .
 Essay comparing the United States Constitution with the religious climate at the time of the Amulonties .
 An in depth verse by verse look at Alma 21 .
 Write up on Alma 21 and later chapters .
 Second look at the Amulonite destruction. 

Book of Mormon peoples